Cedric Mansare (born 18 October 1985) is a French-Guinean basketball player who plays for Union Dax Gamarde and .

National team career
Mansare represents the Guinea national basketball team internationally. At AfroBasket 2021, Mansare averaged 14 points per game and helped his team reach the quarterfinals.

References

External links
Cedric Mansare at RealGM

1985 births
Pully Lausanne Foxes players
Shooting guards
Small forwards
Guinean men's basketball players
Étendard de Brest players
JA Vichy players
French men's basketball players
Living people
French sportspeople of Guinean descent
Black French sportspeople